This is a list of episodes from the anime series Witch Hunter Robin. They are arranged in accordance to episode number. The series uses two theme songs. The opening theme "Shell" was written by Hitomi Mieno, composed and arranged by Hideyuki Daichi Suzuki, and performed by Bana. The ending theme "half pain" was also written by Hitomi Mieno and performed by Bana and was composed by Takao Asami and Taku Iwasaki.

Episode list

External links
 

Witch Hunter Robin